Air Commodore Sudhindra Kumar Majumdar (Bengali:সুধীন্দ্র কুমার মজুমদার) (8 October 1927 – 20 July 2011) was an officer and helicopter pioneer in the Indian Air Force.

Early life

Majumdar was born on 7 October 1927 at Patna, Bihar, India. His parents were Shri. S. K. Majumdar, Bar-at-Law, and Smt. Jyoti Devi.

Military career

Fixed-wing aircraft
Majumdar began his flying career with Royal Indian Air Force (RIAF).  At the height of the Second World War in 1945, he was inducted in the RIAF. He received his ‘flying wings’ in 1948, and commissioned on 14 May as a Pilot Officer and Flying Officer, flying Hurricanes and Spitfires – in the halcyon days of the fledgling Air Force of newly independent India.

He continued flying fixed-wing craft with the Indian Air Force (the word "Royal" was dropped in 1950), prior to selection for helicopters in 1953.

Helicopters
When India decided to induct the Sikorsky S-55 helicopter for the IAF, then Flight Lieutenant S. K. Majumdar was selected to be sent to the United States along with Flight Lieutenant Neil Todd, for training, on the selected type for induction into the Indian Air Force.

During his long innings in the Indian Air Force, he achieved many firsts:
 First pilot in the Indian defence and para-military forces to fly the helicopter, an S-55 Sikorsky, in India (March 1954)
 First helicopter qualified flying instructor
 First to do an amphibious operation
 Founder of the helicopter training unit of the Indian Air Force
 First to carry out a roof-top landing (1959).

Apart from pioneering the concepts of usage of helicopter in India, he was a pioneer in mountain terrain operations. He "evolved concepts of mountain flying in erstwhile NEFA (Arunachal Pradesh), Assam, Nagaland and Jammu and Kashmir, and displayed an astonishing degree of dedication and professionalism."

After 29 years of distinguished service in the Indian Air Force, he retired in March 1977. 'Clients' during his Air Force time included former prime ministers Jawaharlal Nehru and Indira Gandhi. His career is also noteworthy for being accident-free.

In recognition of his yeoman service and pioneering work in the field of helicopter aviation, he was awarded Sikorsky Pioneering Award in 2004 by the Rotary Wing Society of India.

Anecdotes
There are many anecdotes of his life involving political stalwarts like Jawaharlal Nehru, K. K. Menon, Indira Gandhi, V. V. Giri and the like.  He had many stories to tell about his experiences.

He was regarded by his peers and family as "cheerful [and] generous" with "very high integrity, honesty and extremely patriotic. He had a good sense of humour and was a great story teller."

Death
Early in the morning of 20 July 2011, Air Commodore SK Majumdar - "First military helicopter pilot of India", "Doyen of the Indian Air Force", "Father of One-Oh-Four Helicopter Sqd, (Fire Birds)" - bid us his last good bye after a semi-prolonged illness! He died at age 83 at the Army Research and Referral Hospital in the Delhi Cantt section of New Delhi.

References

External links 
 

Indian Air Force personnel
1927 births
2011 deaths
People from Patna
Bengali Hindus